Blue Star Donuts is a small chain of gourmet donut shops. The business has operated in Portland, Oregon, Los Angeles, and Tokyo.

History 
Blue Star launched a CBD-infused donut in 2019. It went under a major downsizing in June 2020. It declared Chapter 11 bankruptcy in August 2020, but was reorganized and emerged from protection in December 2020.

All locations were temporarily closed in 2020 because of the COVID-19 pandemic, and began selling "limited edition" products in grocery stores.

Locations
 SW Jefferson St. 
South Waterfront
 SE Division 
 North Mississippi
 Portland International Airport
 Los Angeles (Manhattan Beach, Silver Lake, and Venice)
 Tokyo (Shibuya Ward)

Previously, there were locations in downtown Portland, NW 23rd Ave, Beaverton Progress Ridge and Multnomah Village all of which closed between May and June 2020.

References

External links

 
 

Companies that filed for Chapter 11 bankruptcy in 2020
Doughnut shops in the United States
Restaurants in Los Angeles
Restaurants in Portland, Oregon
Restaurants in Tokyo